"If I Had My Wish Tonight" is a song written by Randy Goodrum and Dave Loggins originally released in 1979 by Dave Loggins on his self-titled album. American singer-songwriter David Lasley covered the song on his Missin' Twenty Grand album, releasing it as the first single. The song debuted on March 13, 1982, and reached a peak position of 36 on the Billboard Hot 100 on May 1, 1982.

The song was produced by Lasley with strings arranged by Arif Mardin. Dave Iveland is credited as co-producer and recording engineer. Bonnie Raitt contributed background vocals. It appears on Lasley's Back To Blue-Eyed Soul Collected Works released in 2001 and on EMI compilations Lost Hits of the 80s Vol. 2 and AOL Light Mellow: EMI Edition.

Composition, lyrics and style 
Don Shewey for the Boston Phoenix described the performance and delivery of the lyrics "while the singer wails, a sort of Greek chorus led by Bonnie Raitt emblazons the wish on the back of the departing lover: "'Stead of walkin' away/You'd want me to stay/You would want me" (note the insistence of those "w" sounds)."

Credits and personnel 

 Bonnie Raitt – backing vocals
 Chuck Cochran – backing vocals, guitar
 David Lasley – lead and backing vocals, producer
 Wade Short – bass
 David Benoit – conductor, electric piano, organ
 Jody Linscott  – congas
 Willie Wilcox – drums
 Marty Walsh – guitar
 David Garibaldi – percussion
 Bill Schnee – engineer, mixing 
 Benny Facone – engineer
 Paul McKenna – engineer, assistant 
 Dave Iveland – producer, recording 
 Derek DuNann – recording
 David Loggins – songwriter
 Randy Goodrum – songwriter
 Arif Mardin – string arrangement

Critical reception 
Don Shewey for the Boston Phoenix praised the song writing "the sumptuous semi-hit" calling Lasley's falsetto "so passionate that the second verse trails off midway (perhaps to allow the singer to break down a la James Brown)" declaring it "a mini-masterpiece, milked for every drop by Arif Mardin's superb string arrangement."

References 

1979 songs
1982 singles
EMI Records singles
Songs written by Dave Loggins
Songs written by Randy Goodrum
Redirects from songs
David Lasley songs